Vardan Israelian (born 14 September 1966) is a former Armenian footballer and Ukrainian football functionary, president of FC Stal Kamianske.

He is a graduate of the Yerevan Polytechnic Institute.

References

External links
 
 
 

1966 births
Living people
Footballers from Yerevan
Armenian expatriate sportspeople in Ukraine
Ukrainian businesspeople
Ukrainian football chairmen and investors
Armenian footballers
Soviet footballers
FC Armavir (Armenia) players
FC Urartu players
FC Stal Kamianske
FC Metalurh Donetsk
Armenian emigrants to Ukraine
Association football defenders
Ukrainian people of Armenian descent